Ruuhkainen Taivas is the fifth studio album of Ismo Alanko Säätiö. It was released in 2006.

Track listing 
"Hämärämies" – 4:07
"Surun murtama" – 4:08
"Paskiainen" – 2:52
"Miksi arki näyttää tältä" – 3:17
"2.45" – 3:48
"Liitto" – 4:58
"Ruuhkainen Taivas" – 1:22
"Ilman seuraa" – 2:29
"Savolainen Tiibetissä" – 3:20
"Rakkauden saituri" – 3:28
"Haaveiden sillan alla" – 4:43
"Kun vapaus koittaa" – 4:12

Personnel 
 Ismo Alanko – vocals, guitar, keyboards, percussion
 Jarno Karjalainen – bass, vocals, percussion
 Timo Kämäräinen – guitar, steel guitar, piano, vocals, percussion
 Riku Mattila – guitar
 Marko Timonen – drums, percussion

2006 albums
Ismo Alanko Säätiö albums